Bikenibeu Paeniu, PC (born 10 May 1956) is a politician from Tuvalu. He represented the constituency of Nukulaelae in the Parliament of Tuvalu. He has served twice as the Prime Minister of Tuvalu, and now serving as Tuvalu ambassador to Taiwan since June 2022.

Political career

Paeniu made his entrance on the political scene in November 1989, when he won a seat in the Parliament of Tuvalu following a by-election.

First period of office as Prime Minister

Following the 1989 Tuvaluan general election on 27 September 1989, he challenged incumbent Prime Minister Tomasi Puapua in the general election and won, becoming the youngest ever Prime Minister of Tuvalu at age 33. Paeniu formed a five-member Cabinet on 16 October 1989.

The next general election was held on 25 November 1993. In the subsequent parliament the members were evenly split in their support of Bikenibeu Paeniu and the former Prime Minister Tomasi Puapua.

As a consequence, the Governor-General dissolved the parliament on 22 September and a further election took place on 25 November 1993. The subsequent parliament elected Kamuta Latasi as prime minister on 10 December 1993, with a 7:5 majority over the group a members of parliament headed by Bikenibeu Paeniu.

Second period of office as Prime Minister

Kamuta Latasi was the prime minister until 24 December 1996. As the result the vote on a motion of no confidence Kamuta Latasi resigned and Bikenibeu Paeniu was elected as prime minister for the second time.

In his second premiership term, an issue which arose was the controversy surrounding the design of the national flag of Tuvalu. Paeniu successfully led moves to revert the flag to a previously used design which included the British Union Jack. Paeniu is less overtly republican in inclination than Latasi.

On 18 December 1997 the parliament was dissolved and the general election was held on 26 March 1998. Bikenibeu Paeniu was re-elected prime minister on 8 April 1998.  Paeniu remained as prime minister until he resigned following the vote on a motion of no confidence on 27 April 1999 and Ionatana Ionatana was elected as prime minister.

Subsequent career

Paeniu sat as a Member of Parliament, representing the constituency of Nukulaelae island, until 2006. In addition, he served as Minister of Finance and Economic Planning in the cabinets of Koloa Talake, Saufatu Sopoanga and Maatia Toafa.

Paeniu lost his seat in Parliament in the 2006 general election. He faced challenge not only from independent Namoliki Sualiki, but also from his own brother and nephew, Iefata and Luke, who stood against him in his constituency. Bikenibeu Paeniu received 65 votes (ahead of Lukes's 64 and Iefata's 21), but Sualiki was elected with 109.

Paeniu is an alumnus in University of the South Pacific in Fiji, where he resides as of 2016.

See also
 Politics of Tuvalu

References

Prime Ministers of Tuvalu
Finance Ministers of Tuvalu
Ambassadors of Tuvalu to Taiwan
1956 births
Living people
People from Nukulaelae
People from the Gilbert Islands
Members of the Privy Council of the United Kingdom
University of the South Pacific alumni
Tuvaluan republicans